Austin Central Fire Station 1, is a fire station at 401 East Fifth Street in Downtown Austin, Texas, United States. It is a part of the Austin Fire Department.

The Austin Fire Museum is located in the historic station.  The museum's exhibits include firefighting equipment, uniforms, and memorabilia from Texas' first African American firefighters.

The building became a part of the National Register of Historic Places on May 5, 2000.

References

External links
 Austin Fire Museum - official site

National Register of Historic Places in Austin, Texas
Central Fire Station
Museums in Austin, Texas
Fire stations on the National Register of Historic Places in Texas